The Catherine wheel or pinwheel is a type of firework consisting either of a powder-filled spiral tube, or an angled rocket mounted with a pin through its center. When ignited, the energy of the fireworks not only create sparks and flame, but cause the wheel to quickly rotate, making the display much more spectacular. The physics of the process are those of an aeolipile.

The firework is named after Saint Catherine of Alexandria who, according to Christian tradition, was condemned to death by “breaking on the wheel”. When she touched the wheel it miraculously fell to pieces.

The largest Catherine wheel ever made was designed by the Lily Fireworks Factory of Mqabba, Malta.

In Malta, Catherine wheels are a traditional fixture during every village 'festa'. Some villages even hold competitions on the eve of the parish feast, while others display the vast work of one firework. Entrants display a variety of moving shapes and include various colours year after year as the technology progresses. These displays are only a small part of the firework catalogue planned throughout the week preceding the feast and on the feast day itself. The Catherine wheel displays typically end with the burning of what is called 'the carpet': the largest Catherine wheel in the display on the night. 

In the Philippines, Catherine wheel is also known as trompillo and according to Republic Act 7183, it is a legal firework.

References

Types of fireworks